The Belle Fourche Valley Railway was a South Dakotan railway. The Belle Fourche Valley Railway Company was incorporated under South Dakota law on May 26, 1909, and its railway line began operating on July 1, 1910. The railway was an extension of an existing 88-mile Chicago and North Western Railroad line that ran through Butte and Meade Counties, ending in Belle Fourche. The company itself was leased by the Chicago and North Western Railroad on July 1, 1912. It is now defunct.

References

Defunct South Dakota railroads
Railway lines opened in 1910
Railway companies established in 1909
Transportation in Butte County, South Dakota
Predecessors of the Chicago and North Western Transportation Company
Railway companies disestablished in 1920